Charles Chatman (born 1961) served 26 years in prison due to a wrongful conviction. He had been convicted in 1981 at the age of 20 of aggravated rape and sentenced to life in prison. He was released on 3 January 2008. Chatman became the 15th inmate from Dallas County since 2001 to be exonerated by DNA testing. He stated that race was a factor in his conviction. "I was convicted because a black man committed a crime against a white woman." Chatman was represented by Michelle Moore and Jeff Blackburn, attorneys for the Innocence Project of Texas.

Artistic Responses to the Chatman Case
In 2009, New York City Poet Jeanann Verlee wrote "Resurrection," a poem written in the voice of Charles Chatman.  The poem was broadcast on the August 31, 2009 Indiefeed Performance Poetry Podcast.

See also
 List of wrongful convictions in the United States

References

People from Texas
Living people
1961 births
Overturned convictions in the United States